In mathematics, in the field of tropical analysis, the log semiring is the semiring structure on the logarithmic scale, obtained by considering the extended real numbers as logarithms. That is, the operations of addition and multiplication are defined by conjugation: exponentiate the real numbers, obtaining a positive (or zero) number, add or multiply these numbers with the ordinary algebraic operations on real numbers, and then take the logarithm to reverse the initial exponentiation. Such operations are also known as, e.g., logarithmic addition, etc. As usual in tropical analysis, the operations are denoted by ⊕ and ⊗ to distinguish them from the usual addition + and multiplication × (or ⋅). These operations depend on the choice of base  for the exponent and logarithm ( is a choice of logarithmic unit), which corresponds to a scale factor, and are well-defined for any positive base other than 1; using a base  is equivalent to using a negative sign and using the inverse .

The log semiring has the tropical semiring as limit ("tropicalization", "dequantization") as the base goes to infinity  (max-plus semiring) or to zero  (min-plus semiring), and thus can be viewed as a deformation ("quantization") of the tropical semiring. Notably, the addition operation, logadd (for multiple terms, LogSumExp) can be viewed as a deformation of maximum or minimum. The log semiring has applications in mathematical optimization, since it replaces the non-smooth maximum and minimum by a smooth operation. The log semiring also arises when working with numbers that are logarithms (measured on a logarithmic scale), such as decibels (see ), log probability, or log-likelihoods.

Definition 
The operations on the log semiring can be defined extrinsically by mapping them to the non-negative real numbers, doing the operations there, and mapping them back. The non-negative real numbers with the usual operations of addition and multiplication form a semiring (there are no negatives), known as the probability semiring, so the log semiring operations can be viewed as pullbacks of the operations on the probability semiring, and these are isomorphic as rings.

Formally, given the extended real numbers } and a base , one defines:

Note that regardless of base, log multiplication is the same as usual addition, since logarithms take multiplication to addition; however, log addition depends on base.

More concisely, the unit log semiring can be defined for base  as:

with additive unit  and multiplicative unit 0; this corresponds to the max convention.

The opposite convention is also common, and corresponds to the base , the minimum convention:

with additive unit  and multiplicative unit 0.

Properties 
A log semiring is in fact a semifield, since all numbers other than the additive unit  (or ) has a multiplicative inverse, given by  since  Thus log division ⊘ is well-defined, though log subtraction ⊖ is not always defined.

A mean can be defined by log addition and log division (as the quasi-arithmetic mean corresponding to the exponent), as

Note that this is just addition shifted by  since logarithmic division corresponds to linear subtraction.

A log semiring has the usual Euclidean metric, which corresponds to the logarithmic scale on the positive real numbers.

Similarly, a log semiring has the usual Lebesgue measure, which is an invariant measure with respect to log multiplication (usual addition, geometrically translation) with corresponds to the logarithmic measure on the probability semiring.

See also 
 Logarithmic mean
 LogSumExp
 Softmax

Notes

References 

Semiring
Tropical analysis